The Ekin WHE Airbuggy is a British single-seat autogyro designed and built by the W. H. Ekin (Engineering) Company in Northern Ireland.

Development
The company was formed in 1969 to manufacturer six McCandless M-4 Gyroplanes under licence. The company improved the design to produce the Airbuggy which was first flown on 1 February 1973. It was a conventional single-seat autogyro with a rear-mounted  Volkswagen flat-four motor car engine. It had a fixed tricycle landing gear with an open cockpit in a nacelle forward of the rotor pylon. The first Airbuggy was delivered in December 1975.

Specifications

See also

References

Notes

Bibliography

1970s British civil utility aircraft
Single-engined pusher autogyros
Aircraft first flown in 1973